This page lists the World Best Year Performance in the year 2009 in the men's decathlon. The main event during this season were the 2009 World Athletics Championships in Berlin, Germany, where the competition was held on August 19 and August 20, 2009.

Records

2009 World Year Ranking

See also
2009 Hypo-Meeting

References
decathlon2000
IAAF
apulanta
topsinathletics

2009
Decathlon Year Ranking, 2009